The 1939 European Wrestling Championships were held in 24–27 April 1939 Oslo, Norway. The competitions were held only in Greco-Roman wrestling.

Medal table

Medal summary

Men's Greco-Roman

References

External links
FILA Database

Wrestling
International sports competitions in Oslo
European Wrestling
1939 in European sport
Sports competitions in Oslo